The Man Who Wouldn't Die is a 1995 action mystery film by director Bill Condon.  The film, which aired as a movie of the week during the May Sweeps in 1995, stars Roger Moore, Nancy Allen and Malcolm McDowell. Internationally, it received either a theatrical or direct-to-video release.

Synopsis
In The Man Who Wouldn't Die art imitates life for Thomas Grace (Roger Moore), a famous British ex-novelist who wrote a series of acclaimed crime stories featuring a villain patterned after real-life criminal Bernard Drake (Malcolm McDowell).  Now living in America, Grace works as a hack reporter for a city newspaper.  After reading one of Grace's books, Jessie Gallardo (Nancy Allen), a waitress with burgeoning psychic abilities, predicts several murders—with Grace as one of the victims.  Her visions identify the enemy as Drake, who has escaped from prison by faking his own death in a fire.  As Drake sets out to frame the author for a series of grisly murders based around his novels, it is up to Thomas and Jessie to clear their names, stop him, and stay alive in the process.  Eric McCormack co-stars as a doubtful newspaper colleague.

Cast
Roger Moore as Thomas Grace / Inspector Fulbright
Nancy Allen as Jessie Gallardo
Malcolm McDowell as Bernard Drake / Ian Morrissey
Jackson Davies as Lt. Powers
Eric McCormack as Jack Sullivan
Roman Podhora as Walter Tilley
Gillian Barber as Art Sycophant
Roger R. Cross as McKinnon
Kevin McNulty as Curruthers

Reception
BBC's Radio Times gave the movie 3 stars, saying it had a "dark sense of fun" that was "surely worth an hour and a half of anyone's time."

The Youngstown Vindicator said the film was "thoroughly enjoyable" and "as polished and as surprising as any good mystery drama can provide".

References

External links

The Man Who Wouldn't Die:Overview at MSN

1995 television films
1995 films
1995 crime thriller films
1990s English-language films
Films shot in Vancouver
American serial killer films
Films set in San Francisco
Universal Pictures films
American mystery films
Films directed by Bill Condon
Films about writers
1990s American films